Christoph Friedrich Müller (8 October 1751, Allendorf (Lumda) – 10 April 1808, Schwelm) was a theologian and cartographer in Schwelm.

Mueller studied theology, mathematics, astronomy and the sciences.  In addition, he learned four languages. He was pastor from 1776 in Bad Sassendorf, from 1782 in Unna, and from 1785 in Schwelm.

1751 births
1808 deaths
People from Giessen (district)